Major-General Christoph August von Wangenheim  (23 March 1741 in Hanover – 23 June 1830 in Hanover) was a German Hanoverian army officer and court official.

Biography
Von Wangenheim entered the Hannoverian Army in 1757. Over the next twenty years he was gradual promoted and became a major in 1777. Between 1782–1787 von Wangenheim served in India with the East India Company but retained his commission in the Royal Hanoverian army. During this time, he kept a concise diary, which was published as an annotated version in 2017. He commanded Hanoverian brigade at the battle of Cuddalore (13 June 1783).  Also during that time he led a contingent 1,400 Hanoverians, along with a company of European and sepoy soldiers to suppress a mutiny of a British Army regiment. In 1797 he was promoted to Major-General.

In India in 1783 von Wangenheim treated a wounded French sergeant who was his prisoner with kindness. Two  decades later (in 1803), when France conquered Hanover, Bernadotte, the French commanding general reintroduced himself to von Wangenheim and thanked him for his kindness 20 years earlier.

Between 1814 and 1819 von Wangenheim was a member of the Hanoverian Parliament. In 1819 he accepted the office of Hofmarschall (an administrative post in charge of a princely German court).

Notes

References

Tzoref Ashkenazi, Chen (2019). "German soldiern in eighteenth century India", in MIDA Archival Reflexicon, pp. 1-8.

1741 births
1830 deaths
Military personnel from Hanover
Military personnel of Hanover